Dhanni  may refer to:

Dhanni dialect, an Indo-Aryan dialect cluster of Pakistan
Dhanni (cattle), a breed of cattle from Punjab, Pakistan
Dhanni, a region of Pakistan, falling mostly within Chakwal Tehsil

See also 
 Dhani (disambiguation)